Johannes Gijsbertus Bastiaans (31 October 1812, Wilp - 16 February 1875, Haarlem) was a Dutch organist, composer and music theorist. Bastiaans was educated in organ playing from the age of ten in Deventer. He studied to become a watchmaker and settled in Rotterdam. There he meet C.F. Hommert, who introduced him to the works of Johann Sebastian Bach.

He moved to Germany where he studied with amongst others Felix Mendelssohn-Bartholdy and F. Becker. In 1839 he became organist for the Mennonite congregation in Deventer. In 1840 he became organist at the Zuiderkerk in Amsterdam, and between 1858-1878 he was cityorganist at the Grote Kerk in Haarlem.

He was one of the driving forces behind the growing attention for J.S. Bach in the Netherlands. Bastiaans wrote several chorales and works for the organ and piano. He also wrote several melodies for the church book  Vervolgbundel op de Evangelische Gezangen. The church song book Liedboek voor de Kerken lists 9 songs that are accompanied by his melodies.

References 
  Een compendium van achtergrondinformatie bij de 491 gezangen uit het Liedboek voor de kerken, Prof.Dr. G. van de Leeuw-Stichting, 3rd edition, Zoetermeer, 1998,

External links  
Johannes Gijsbertus Bastiaans: orgelwerken I - Radio 5, 9 December 2012

1812 births
1875 deaths
Classical composers of church music
Dutch male classical composers
Dutch classical composers
Dutch classical organists
Male classical organists
People from Voorst
19th-century Dutch male musicians
19th-century organists